The 2014 Lafayette Leopards football team represented Lafayette College in the 2014 NCAA Division I FCS football season. The Leopards were led by 15th year head coach Frank Tavani and played their home games at Fisher Stadium. They were a member of the Patriot League. They finished the season 5–6, 3–3 in Patriot League play to finish in a tie for third place.

Schedule

References

Lafayette
Lafayette Leopards football seasons
Lafayette Leopards football